The borough of Eastbourne, one of six local government districts in the English county of East Sussex, has more than 50 current and former churches and other places of worship.  Several other former places of worship are still in existence but are no longer in religious use.  The borough is on the English Channel coast and encompasses the town of Eastbourne and its suburbs.  Until the late 18th century, the area was mostly farmland punctuated by four well-spread hamlets; but a fashionable seaside resort gradually developed from about 1780, based on a combination of royal patronage, a good climate, railway connections and the demands of rich visitors.  Church-building rapidly followed; and although the town lacks the range of "worthwhile Victorian churches" found in seaside resorts such as Brighton and Bournemouth, a wide variety of architectural themes and denominations are represented. 46 places of worship are in use in the borough and a further nine former churches and chapels no longer hold religious services but survive in alternative uses.

Most residents of Eastbourne identify themselves as Christian, and churches representing many Christian denominations exist in the town.  The largest number of these, including the town's oldest church, belong to the Church of England, the country's officially established church.  Several Nonconformist and Roman Catholic churches were founded in the 19th century, while new churches were established on housing estates such as The Hydneye and Langney as the town grew inland.  There are also Jewish and Muslim places of worship.

Historic England or its predecessor English Heritage have awarded listed status to several current and former church buildings in Eastbourne.  A building is defined as "listed" when it is placed on a statutory register of buildings of "special architectural or historic interest" in accordance with the Planning (Listed Buildings and Conservation Areas) Act 1990.  The Department for Digital, Culture, Media and Sport, a Government department, is responsible for this; Historic England, a non-departmental public body, acts as an agency of the department to administer the process and advise the department on relevant issues.  There are three grades of listing status. Grade I, the highest, is defined as being of "exceptional interest"; Grade II* is used for "particularly important buildings of more than special interest"; and Grade II, the lowest, is used for buildings of "special interest".

Overview and history of religious worship in Eastbourne

The district of Wealden surrounds it to the west and north; the English Channel is to the east and south. High cliffs, including Beachy Head, rise in the southwest corner. The area was inhabited in the Stone Age, and a large Roman villa stood near the present-day Eastbourne Pier. Four hamlets developed independently on the mainly agricultural land behind the cliffs: Meads, Seahouses, South Bourne and Bourne (also referred to as Old Town or East Bourne). Farming, fishing and occasional smuggling were the main activities, and religious worship was focused on Old Town's 12th-century St Mary the Virgin Church, a large flint and stone structure with later additions. Sea-bathing and drinking seawater for medicinal reasons, popularised by Dr Richard Russell in nearby Brighton, became popular in the late 18th century at Bourne's beach, and a visit by Prince Edward in 1780 encouraged tourism. All the land in the area was owned by two rich families: the Davies-Gilberts and the Dukes of Devonshire. They oversaw the development of the town, ensured architectural harmony and encouraged the construction of a range of facilities appropriate to a growing, high-class town—from theatres and private schools to churches. Unlike at Brighton, Worthing and other Sussex seaside resorts, development was slow and steady with periods of stability and inactivity.

Into this quiet, high-class environment, with its libraries and expensive lodging-houses, came Canon Thomas Pitman—Vicar of Eastbourne for 62 years from 1828.  He recognised that the town needed a new Anglican church closer to the focus of seafront development, convinced William Cavendish, 7th Duke of Devonshire to donate land, and raised £2,500 (£ as of ) himself.  The chapel of ease to St Mary the Virgin Church, designed by Decimus Burton and opened in 1838, later became Holy Trinity Church—modern Eastbourne's first Anglican church.  More churches were built throughout the Victorian era, especially in the town centre: Benjamin Ferrey's Christ Church opened in 1859; St Saviour's Church was built eight years later on another tract of land donated by the Duke of Devonshire; London-based architect A.P. Strong's multicoloured All Souls Church, funded by Lady Victoria Wellesley, opened in 1882; and St Peter's Church (demolished in 1971) was built by Henry Currey in 1894 to replace a temporary church of 1878.  The Meads and Upperton suburbs were served by St John the Evangelist's Church (1869) and St Anne's Church (1881) respectively.  The architectural quality of these churches has been described—notably by Nairn and Pevsner in the Buildings of England series of books—as inferior to that of other southern English seaside resorts, in particular Brighton and Bournemouth.  George Edmund Street's St Saviour's Church is considered the best by most architectural historians (including Pevsner and Goodhart-Rendel), in particular because of its dominance of the townscape and the Spanish-influenced narrowing of the interior towards the chancel in order to emphasise that part of the building.  All Souls Church is "one of the most striking Victorian churches in Sussex" because of its enormous campanile, brightly coloured brickwork, intricate terracotta work and Italianate/Romanesque/Byzantine architecture.

Eastbourne was ravaged by bombs during World War II—it was the worst hit town on the south coast of England—and several churches were damaged or destroyed.  St Anne's Church in Upperton was wrecked, and demolished without replacement in 1955; only the tower of St John the Evangelist's Church in Meads survived; a Junkers Ju 88 destroyed St Mary's Church at Hampden Park (again, apart from its bell tower) in 1940; and the newly built St Elisabeth's Church on Victoria Drive was damaged.  After the war, new Anglican churches were built on two 20th-century housing estates: St Peter's at Hydneye dates from 1953, and St Richard's in Langney was completed in 1956.  Some older Anglican churches have since been demolished, although one—St Philip's in the east end of town—was replaced by a mixed-use building which retains some worship space.

After the English Reformation, Roman Catholicism in the Eastbourne area faded away. Censuses in 1603, 1676, 1724 and 1780 recorded no recusants in the area, although a few still lived in nearby villages. The Papists Act 1778 and Roman Catholic Relief Act 1791 removed many restrictions on their worship, education and legal rights. A Mission was set up further along the coast at St Leonards in 1830 by three retired priests, and a permanent priest was put in charge of it in 1841. The Mission was responsible for Roman Catholic worship, pastoral care and administration across a large area of East Sussex, including Eastbourne. By 1862, the priest in charge stated that the town would soon needs its own Mission. Nevertheless, Eastbourne's 19th-century Roman Catholic community developed slowly: in 1867, when Father Charles King moved to the town and started celebrating Mass in his house in Ceylon Place, he said that around five or six worshippers typically attended. (Many coastguards based along the coast and soldiers passing through the town also practised the faith, though, so attendances may often have been higher.) Stella Maris Church on Junction Road, an Early English-style brick structure built in 1868–69 for £450 (£ as of ), became the congregation's first permanent place of worship. The Early English-style brick building could hold 100 people, and was well-attended on its official opening day of 1 April 1869. It closed in 1890 and was demolished three years later. In 1890, a former covered market in Grove Road became Eastbourne's new Roman Catholic church, but the building had some structural problems and the arrangement was intended to be temporary while land and funds for a permanent church were sought. This took more than a decade, but a site was bought from the Duke of Devonshire and the first stone of Our Lady of Ransom Church was laid on 12 December 1900. Another church was built later in the northern suburb of Hampden Park.

Formal Methodist worship in the Eastbourne area traces its roots to 1810 when a Wesleyan chapel was built on the present Grove Road.  This was superseded by another nearby in 1863–64, which was rebuilt in 1907–08 as the Central Methodist Church.  Other Wesleyan chapels were opened in the Old Town (1898; later named Greenfield Methodist Church) and the east end of the town (1904).  Close to the latter was Beamsley Primitive Methodist Chapel (1886), which was superseded by St Aidan's Church in 1913.  Both were provided for Primitive Methodists, a group which united with Wesleyans in 1932 to form the present Methodist Church denomination.  A new Methodist church dedicated to St Stephen opened in Hampden Park in 1960, while St Aidan's was closed and demolished in the early 21st century.  The Methodist Statistical Returns published in 1947 recorded the existence of Central, Greenfield and St Aidan's Churches and a chapel of Wesleyan origin in the Willingdon area; all were part of the seven-church Eastbourne Circuit.

The Congregational church held its first services in Eastbourne in 1862, and churches were built on Pevensey Road in 1864 and in Upperton in 1885 (this became the church hall when a larger church was built in 1900–01).  Meanwhile, the Presbyterian Church of England opened chapels in the town centre (St Andrew's; 1878) and at Hampden Park (St Luke's; 1913).  In 1972 the two denominations came together as the United Reformed Church, of which all four churches became part.  Subsequently, Pevensey Road chapel was sold and the proceeds used to build a new joint Baptist, Methodist and United Reformed church in Langney (St Barnabas'; 1975–76), and St Luke's was closed in 2005 and later demolished.  Its congregation moved to Hampden Park's Methodist church which now represents both denominations under the name Broadway United Church.

In 2015, the Methodist and United Reformed Churches announced plans for a merger between four of their congregations—Central and Greenfield Methodist churches and St Andrew's and Upperton United Reformed churches—and the consolidation of worship on the Upperton site, where the 1900–01 chapel and its 1885 predecessor would be demolished and replaced with a new building named Emmanuel Church.  The other three churches would then close.  Planning permission was granted in June 2016 to demolish St Andrew's Church and replace all but the façade with flats.  Greenfield Methodist Church's name was changed to Emmanuel and it now holds services for both denominations. The Upperton church remained open for a little longer, offering United Reformed services under the name Upperton with St Andrew's, but demolition work began on 5 August 2019.  Central Methodist Church is now occupied by the Church of God Worldwide Mission, a Pentecostal group which had met locally for 20 years but which had no church building of its own.  CPL Chartered Architects, who earlier worked on Broadway United Church, were commissioned to design the new combined church, community centre and café on the Upperton Road site and to design new residential buildings for the Greenfield and St Andrew's Church sites, the redevelopment of which will help to fund the new building.

General Baptist worship in Eastbourne can be traced back to 1871, when a tin tabernacle was erected in the town centre.  It was replaced by a permanent church, Ceylon Place Baptist Church, in 1885.  This was used for the next 120 years, but after it closed the church came close to folding.  It was renamed New Hope Church in 2010 and shared premises until a former social club was acquired in 2015 and converted into a dedicated place of worship.  The Victoria Baptist Church in the west of town opened in 1973 to replace a chapel established in the Old Town in the 1920s.  Strict Baptists have been represented for longer, although the present Grove Road Strict Baptist Church (1881) is not their first building: a predecessor, Marsh Chapel, opened  1805.  Members of the Salvation Army are catered for by two places of worship: a citadel of 1890 in the east of town, and a hall built in 1927 in the Downside area to the west.  Jehovah's Witnesses used part of a building on Susans Road (1946–52) and the first floor of a building on North Street (1955–85) until their new Kingdom Hall in Hampden Park was registered in March of that year.  Christian Scientists worshipped in the town centre from the early 20th century until the closure in 2018 of their purpose-built church in Spencers Road.  The First Church of Christ, Scientist, Eastbourne was established in 1920 at rooms in Terminus Road but moved in 1922 to its permanent church building, Spencers Hall in Spencers Road.  Informal services are now held at a hotel.  Another congregation, the Second Church of Christ, Scientist, Eastbourne, occupied rooms on Terminus Road (1932–37) then a building on Bolton Road until it was dissolved in 1961.

Religious affiliation
According to the 2011 United Kingdom Census, 99,412 people lived in Eastbourne.  Of these, 59.58% identified themselves as Christian, 1.47% were Muslim, 0.48% were Buddhist, 0.43% were Hindu, 0.21% were Jewish, 0.05% were Sikh, 0.59% followed another religion, 29.17% claimed no religious affiliation and 8% did not state their religion.  The proportion of Christians was similar to that of England as a whole (59.38%), while affiliation with Buddhism and faiths in the "any other religion" category was more widespread in Eastbourne: the corresponding figures for England were 0.45% and 0.43% respectively.  The proportion of people with no religious affiliation was also higher than the national figure of 24.74%.  The other religions had much lower proportions of followers than in England overall: the corresponding national percentages were 5.02% for Islam, 1.52% for Hinduism, 0.79% for Sikhism and 0.49% for Judaism.

Administration
All Anglican churches in the borough of Eastbourne are part of the Diocese of Chichester, whose cathedral is at Chichester in West Sussex.  The Rural Deanery of Eastbourne—one of eight deaneries in the Archdeaconry of Lewes and Hastings, which is in turn one of three archdeaconries in the diocese—covers the whole borough and parts of neighbouring districts.

The Roman Catholic Diocese of Arundel and Brighton, whose cathedral is at Arundel, administers Eastbourne's five Roman Catholic churches.  Eastbourne and St Leonards-on-Sea Deanery, one of 11 deaneries in the diocese, covers the parish of Eastbourne (a three-church parish consisting of Our Lady of Ransom, St Gregory and St Agnes) and the joint parish of Langney (Christ the King) and Hampden Park (St Joachim).

The Central Sussex United Area, an ecumenical partnership between the Methodist Church and the United Reformed Church's Southern Synod, was formed in September 2007 to administer churches belonging to those denominations in an area bounded by Haywards Heath, Eastbourne and Crowoborough.  Within the borough, Broadway United Church at Hampden Park, Emmanuel Church and St Barnabas' United Church in Langney, are part of this area.  Also administered by the partnership is The Haven Church—an ecumenical partnership between the Methodist and Anglican churches which meets at a school at Sovereign Harbour.

New Hope and Victoria Baptist Churches and the Baptist congregation at St Barnabas' United Church are administratively part of the East Sussex Network of the South Eastern Baptist Association.  Grove Road Strict Baptist Chapel is affiliated with the Gospel Standard movement.

The Church of Jesus Christ of Latter-day Saints in Eastbourne is part of the Crawley Stake.  The congregation was constituted as a branch in the 1960s.  When the chapel was opened in 2001, the branch became a Ward within the Stake.

Current places of worship

Former places of worship

See also

List of demolished places of worship in East Sussex

Notes

References

Bibliography

 (Available online in 14 parts; Guide to abbreviations on page 6)

Eastbourne
Eastbourne
Eastbourne
Buildings and structures in Eastbourne
Lists of buildings and structures in Eastbourne